The Chattooga Academy, also known as John B. Gordon Hall, is listed on the National Register of Historic Places.

It is a two-story red brick Federal-style building.  It was the site of the Battle of LaFayette during the American Civil War.

It had 15 boys and 37 girls as students in 1838;  students boarded in the homes of families nearby.  Confederate general John B. Gordon (1832-1904) was an early student.

References

School buildings on the National Register of Historic Places in Georgia (U.S. state)
Federal architecture in Georgia (U.S. state)
School buildings completed in 1836
National Register of Historic Places in Walker County, Georgia